Pemberton is a town in the South West region of Western Australia, named after original settler Pemberton Walcott.

History

The region was originally occupied by the Bibbulmun people who knew the area as Wandergarup, which in their language meant 'plenty of water'.

Following an expedition to the area in 1861 by Edward Reveley Brockman, his brother-in-law Gerald de Courcy Lefroy and his uncle Pemberton Walcott, in 1862 Brockman established Warren House homestead and station on the Warren River; Walcott, after whom the town would be named, established Karri Dale farm on the northern outskirts of the later townsite; and Lefroy established a farm and flour mill on Lefroy Brook (the current site of the 100 Year Forest). Walcott remained until at least 1867. By 1868 he was at Dwalganup Station near Boyup Brook, and in 1872 Karri Dale was for sale, marketed as a "four-roomed brick cottage, stockyards, cattle shed, good garden - stocked with fruit trees and permanent running water".

In 1913, the new government-owned State Saw Mills began construction of twin sawmills, No 2 and No 3, at the location then known as Big Brook, to supply half a million railway sleepers for the Trans-Australian Railway. The mill site was in a valley to ensure the mills had a regular supply of water and because it was easier to roll logs down hill to the mills. Big Brook became a thriving private mill town, with a hall, store, staff accommodation, mill workers' cottages, and single men's huts, and two boarding houses. A more distinctive name was soon sought. The name Walcott was suggested but was rejected by the Post Office due to conflict with Port Walcott, also named after Walcott. William Locke Brockman, local farmer and son of early settler Edward Reveley Brockman, suggested Pemberton. The mill town was well established but by 1921 there was community agitation for a government townsite to be declared. Community pressure resulted in lots being surveyed in 1925 and the Pemberton townsite was gazetted in October 1925.

During the 1920s the area was a focus of the Group Settlement Scheme and following the Second World War the War Service Land Settlement Scheme, but with only moderate success.

Modern day
During the 1980s, Pemberton began to grow as a tourist town and tourism, particularly domestic, continues to play a key role.

Log sawmilling was still the most active industry in 2005, occupying 12.8% of the workforce, despite the state government drastically reducing old growth logging in 2003. Rather than shut down, the mill switched to plantation Tasmanian blue gum and pine in addition to karri.

Viticulture is now widely established with many investment schemes buying up large areas of pastureland and converting to vineyards.

Tourism
The most famous is the Gloucester Tree, but there are also the Diamond Tree and the Dave Evans Bicentennial Tree, the tallest of the three at around 71 metres. The trees have metal rungs that allow visitors to climb them and reach the constructed lookout at the top.

Other tourist attractions include the Pemberton Tramway Company, Yeagarup Dunes and the Bibbulmun Track. Tours include river cruises, hiking, canoeing and four-wheel drive tours of the national parks.

The three-day Southern Forests Festival (formerly the Pemberton Autumn Festival/Marron & Wine Festival) is held in May. Pemberton is recognised as one of the premier cool-climate wine regions in Australia, and hosts many wineries in the region.

Pemberton is surrounded by karri forest with five national parks within 20 minutes' drive and has plenty of rivers, streams and dams for recreation. The Karri Forest Explorer Drive has been developed by the Department of Environment and Conservation and links the tourism attractions together along sealed and unsealed roads.

The beautiful forest attractions include Big Brook Dam in the Pemberton State Forest 6 km north on the Bibbulmun Track. Bird hides and jetties, BBQ facilities and sandy beach allow visitors to enjoy this main attraction. The 4 km sealed walk trail around the lake is the perfect venue to take in the tall Karri Forests in the surrounds.

Beedelup Falls in the Beedelup National Park are 30 km north along The Bibbulmun Track. Visitors can explore via a suspension bridge, walk trails and visitor information. The Falls are the break between the Darling Scarp and the Scott River Plain and the tourist drive is sealed with caravan parking.

The Yeagarup Dunes in the D'Entrecasteaux National Park are the largest land-locked inland dunes in the southern hemisphere. They are moving at four metres a year towards the Yeagarup Lake. Local tours are available to experience these remote locations only accessible only by 4WD.

Lake Jasper in the D’Entrecasteaux national park is the largest natural freshwater lake in Western Australia and covers an area of about 450 hectares. It is unique because it has no in or out tributaries and is 10 meters deep and accessible only by 4WD. A little further west is Black Point, in the far northwestern part of the D’Entrecasteaux National Park between Augusta and Windy Harbour. The black Basalt columns were formed about 135 million years ago. Local tours are available.

The Cascades are a series of low falls in the Lefroy brook. The road has been sealed and is accessible from the historic Tram, which departs from Pemberton twice daily.

Climate
Pemberton has a Mediterranean climate, with warm, dry summers and cool, rainy winters.

References

Notes

Bibliography

 
Bushfire affected towns in Western Australia
Forestry in Australia